St. George is an unincorporated community and former incorporated city in St. Louis County, Missouri, United States. The population was 1,337 at the 2010 census.

On November 8, 2011, St. George residents voted 345–128 to disincorporate. The city became part of unincorporated St. Louis County.

Geography

St. George was located at  (38.536152, −90.312237).

Demographics

According to city financial reports obtained from the Missouri State Auditor's office, approximately 28 percent of its 2005 municipal budget came from traffic citations.

2010 census

As of the census of 2010, there were 1,337 people, 673 households, and 320 families living in the city. The racial makeup of the city was 96.2% White, 0.5% African American, 0.4% Native American, 1.0% Asian, 0.1% from other races, and 1.6% from two or more races. Hispanic or Latino of any race were 1.3% of the population.

There were 673 households, of which 21.1% had children under the age of 18 living with them, 31.1% were married couples living together, 12.6% had a female householder with no husband present, 3.9% had a male householder with no wife present, and 52.5% were non-families. 44.4% of all households were made up of individuals, and 21.6% had someone living alone who was 65 years of age or older. The average household size was 1.99 and the average family size was 2.79.

The median age in the city was 41.7 years. 17.7% of residents were under the age of 18; 7.1% were between the ages of 18 and 24; 28.7% were from 25 to 44; 26.5% were from 45 to 64; and 20.1% were 65 years of age or older. The gender makeup of the city was 45.8% male and 54.2% female.

2000 census

As of the census of 2000, there were 1,288 people, 700 households, and 322 families living in the city. The racial makeup of the city was 98.84% White, 0.47% Asian, 0.08% from other races, and 0.62% from two or more races. Hispanic or Latino of any race were 0.78% of the population.

There were 700 households, out of which 16.3% had children under the age of 18 living with them, 33.0% were married couples living together, 11.0% had a female householder with no husband present, and 53.9% were non-families. 49.1% of all households were made up of individuals, and 26.0% had someone living alone who was 65 years of age or older. The average household size was 1.84 and the average family size was 2.68.

In the city the population was spread out, with 15.5% under the age of 18, 6.3% from 18 to 24, 26.8% from 25 to 44, 23.4% from 45 to 64, and 28.0% who were 65 years of age or older. The median age was 46 years. For every 100 females, there were 73.4 males. For every 100 females age 18 and over, there were 70.5 males.

The median income for a household in the city was $33,832, and the median income for a family was $43,681. Males had a median income of $31,250 versus $28,967 for females. The per capita income for the city was $21,924. About 2.4% of families and 3.1% of the population were below the poverty line, including 6.5% of those under age 18 and 1.8% of those age 65 or over.

Police misconduct

Suspension and firing of Sgt. James Kuehnlein

On September 7, 2007, Brett Darrow, a St. Louis City resident, created an Internet sensation after posting an online video of an encounter with St. George police Sgt. James Kuehnlein. In the video, Kuehnlein approaches Darrow while he waits in a parked car in a commuter parking lot. When Darrow asks Kuehnlein whether he did anything wrong, the officer orders Darrow out of the car and threatens to fabricate charges and arrest him.

Darrow told the news media that he pulled into the commuter lot to meet a friend. When the officer asked him for identification, Darrow said he did not immediately present it because he believed the officer stopped him without probable cause. After the video gained popularity on the Internet, Kuehnlein was suspended without pay. In response, St. George Police Chief Scott Uhrig said, "I was very displeased when I saw the actions on the video."

The press later revealed that Sgt. Kuehnlein had been previously arrested for assault and theft, and in late September, he was fired by the city's Board of Aldermen in a 5–0 vote.

In 2013, Kuehnlein was fired from the police department in Velda City, Missouri after a conviction for domestic violence. He was given a five-year suspended sentence, despite his prior criminal record.

Sexual harassment allegations

In 2000, St. George Police Chief Scott Uhrig, while serving as an Arnold, Missouri patrol officer, was accused of sexually harassing a 17-year-old girl during a traffic stop. The State Administrative Hearing Commission found that Scott Uhrig called the teenager "beautiful, hot and tempting". Uhrig also allegedly asked the teen to come to his car for sex. Although Uhrig maintained his innocence, the Commission believed Uhrig acted illegally. They said his unwarranted sexual advances showed he could not enforce the law and were cause for discipline. Uhrig was suspended without pay and put on probation. Several years later, he took the helm at the St. George Police Department.

In December 2009, former Police Chief Scott Uhrig was arrested for sexual misconduct with a child under 15. Although the St. George Police Department was disbanded in late 2008, these charges allege that the crimes took place while Uhrig was chief of the department. He was ultimately found not guilty.

Speed Trap Designation

Arrests of Mayor Harold Goodman

On October 22, 2007, St. George mayor Harold Goodman was arrested for possession of marijuana discovered during the execution of a search warrant at his home. Goodman said that he "used marijuana sparingly when symptoms of Crohn's disease, a chronic inflammation of the gastrointestinal tract, flared up." No information was given at the time for the basis of the search warrant. Goodman took a leave of absence after his arrest.

On October 25, 2007, it was announced that Goodman had been re-arrested, for suspicion of possessing child pornography.

References

Unincorporated communities in St. Louis County, Missouri
Unincorporated communities in Missouri
Former cities in Missouri
Populated places disestablished in 2011